Melanie Tait is an Australian radio broadcaster, playwright and author. She is from Robertson, New South Wales.

Career 
At 20 years of age she wrote the comedy theatrical production The Vegemite Tales, which played in London over seven years from 2001 to 2007, including two years on the West End. The play focused on a group of young adults living in a London flat. During her five years in London, she was also the artistic director of the Old Red Lion Theatre.

Tait, known as Moonky, began her radio career as producer for the John Laws morning show on 2UE in Sydney. She then began at the Australian Broadcasting Corporation in Darwin as a rural reporter trainee. She has since worked at ABC Rural and ABC News throughout New South Wales, South Australia and the Australian Capital Territory. She then worked at 936 ABC Hobart, and is now Executive Editor of Audio at Guardian Australia.

In 2011, Tait created a series of storytelling nights (inspired by "The Moth" podcast) called "Now Hear This". Themes included "I learned the hard way", "Love is a four letter word" and "Changes".

Works

Plays 

 The Vegemite Tales (2007)
The Appleton Ladies' Potato Race (2018/2019)

Books 

 Fat Chance: My Big Fat Gastric Banding Adventure, 2010, New Holland Publishers Australia.

References

External links 
 Profile on ABC Radio
 Recordings on ABC Radio National

Living people
Australian radio personalities
Australian women radio presenters
21st-century Australian dramatists and playwrights
Australian non-fiction writers
University of Wollongong alumni
Australian women dramatists and playwrights
21st-century Australian women writers
Year of birth missing (living people)